Sázavafest is a multicultural, mostly music festival held in the Czech Republic each year around the river Sázava. The first year of the festival was held in 2001 on a single platform. Over time, the event has grown and at the sixth year was performed on seven stages with a large number of well-known Czech interpreters and many foreign guests. In addition to the musical performances there are held readings, e.g. Michal Viewegh or Mardoša. In 2015 became company XANADU-Catering major investor and the festival has expanded the number of performing bands. In previous years the festival consisted of bands including: Alphaville, Kosheen, Sinplus, Support Lesbiens, Ewa Farna, Wohnout, Rytmus, Voxel, UDG or Škwor.

External links and references 
 Official website in English
 Official Facebook in English
 Official YouTube site

References

Rock festivals in the Czech Republic
Music festivals established in 2001
Summer festivals
Summer events in the Czech Republic